These are the results of 2019 BWF World Senior Championships' 45+ events.

Men's singles

Seeds 
  Carsten Loesch (quarter-finals)
  Fernando Silva (bronze medalist)
  Ulf Svensson (fourth round)
  Jaison Xavier (third round)
  Carl Jennings (quarter-finals)
  Christophie Lionne (bronze medalist)
  Stephan Burmeister (fourth round)
  Kiran Vinayakrao Makode (fourth round)
  Junichiro Nagai (third round)
  Terje Jacobsen (third round)
  Stan de Lange (second round)
  Liao Lien-sheng (gold medalist)
  Morten Aarup (fourth round)
  Stefan Edvardsson (quarter-finals)
  Mikael Nilsson (fourth round)
  Henrik Wahlstrøm Hansen (second round)

Finals

Top half

Section 1

Section 2

Section 3

Section 4

Bottom half

Section 5

Section 6

Section 7

Section 8

Women's singles

Seeds 
  Gondáné Fórián Csilla (bronze medalist)
  Georgy van Soerland-Trouerbach (gold medalist)
  Mirella Engelhardt (third round)
  Marika Wippich (third round)
  Anke Treu (second round)
  Barbara Kulanty (quarter-finals)
  Pernille Strøm (quarter-finals)
  Birgitte Pedersen (third round)

Finals

Top half

Section 1

Section 2

Bottom half

Section 3

Section 4

Men's doubles

Seeds 
  Wittaya Panomchai / Pracha Wannawichitr (bronze medalists)
  Jaseel P. Ismail / Jaison Xavier (bronze medalists)
  Morten Aarup / Carsten Loesch (silver medalists)
  Mikael Nilsson / Ulf Svensson (gold medalists)
  Oleg Grigoryev / Vadim Nazarov (quarter-finals)
  Carl Jennings / Mark King (quarter-finals)
  Stefan Edvardsson / Johan Häggman (quarter-finals)
  Surender Kumar / Virender Kumar (third round)
  Junichiro Nagai / Shigeyuki Nakamura (third round)
  Lakshman Homer / Ajith Upendra Perera Jaya Samarakoon Miriyagodage (third round)
  Cheng Ho-chan / Liao Lien-sheng (third round)
  Stephan Burmeister / André Wiechmann (first round)
  Thaweesak Koetsriphan / Naruthum Surakkhaka (third round)
  Justin G. Andrews / Simon Gilhooly (third round)
  Henrik Wahlstrøm Hansen / Eril Pedersen (third round)
  Joël Renaudeau / Cyrille Vu (first round)

Finals

Top half

Section 1

Section 2

Bottom half

Section 3

Section 4

Women's doubles

Seeds 
  Natalia Gonchar / Olga Kuznetsova (silver medalists)
  Christina Rindshøj / Dorte Steenberg (bronze medalists)
  Louise Culyer / Tracy Hutchinson (quarter-finals)
  Dorota Grzejdak / Barbara Kulanty (second round)
  Marielle van der Woerdt / Georgy van Soerland-Trouerbach (gold medalists)
  Mirella Engelhardt / Marika Wippich (second round)
  Debbie Beeston-Smith / Olga Bryant (second round)
  Janne Vang Nielsen / Birgitte Pedersen (quarter-finals)

Finals

Top half

Section 1

Section 2

Bottom half

Section 3

Section 4

Mixed doubles

Seeds 
  Carsten Loesch / Dorte Steenberg (bronze medalists)
  Morten Aarup / Lene Struwe Andersen (silver medalists)
  Stan de Lange / Georgy van Soerland-Trouerbach (third round)
  Vadim Nazarov / Olga Kuznetsova (gold medalists)
  Thaweesak Koetsriphan / Angela Charumilinda (quarter-finals)
  Justin G. Andrews / Betty Blair (second round)
  Naruthum Surakkhaka / Puangthip Kaosamaang (quarter-finals)
  Henrik Wahlstrøm Hansen / Malene Wahlstrøm Hansen (second round)

Finals

Top half

Section 1

Section 2

Bottom half

Section 3

Section 4

References 

Men's singles
Women's singles
Men's doubles
Women's doubles
Mixed doubles

2019 BWF World Senior Championships